Balderdash and Piffle is a British television programme on BBC in which the writers of the Oxford English Dictionary asked the public for help in finding the origins and first known citations of a number of words and phrases. Presented by Victoria Coren, it was a companion to the dictionary's Wordhunt project.

The OED panel consisted of John Simpson, the Chief Editor of the OED; Peter Gilliver, who was also the captain of the Oxford University Press team in University Challenge: The Professionals; and etymologist Tania Styles, who also appeared in the "dictionary corner" in Countdown.

Series 1
The first series of Balderdash and Piffle was originally broadcast in January 2006, each programme being based around a letter. Following the conclusion of the first series, a follow-up episode aired on 16 April 2006 with updates on the discoveries members of the public had made, resulting in several further changes to the dictionary.

Series 2
A new Wordhunt began in January 2007 and the results featured in the second series of the programme which premiered on Friday 11 May at 10pm on BBC Two.

The second series was divided thematically. Victoria Coren was joined by guest reporters who attempted to trace the etymology and first documentary use of words, based on suggestions from the British public. Victoria Coren then took the evidence they had found to a panel of OED staff, who decided whether this evidence was sufficient to include in the dictionary.

The books
Balderdash and Piffle is also the name given to two books written by Alex Games. The first, titled Balderdash and Piffle was published by BBC Books in 2006. A second book, also by Alex Games and published by BBC Books, is titled Balderdash and Piffle: One sandwich short of a dog's dinner and accompanied the second series of the show.

The two books explore the origins of a number of words in the English language, including randy, shampoo and bouncy castle.

References

External links
 
BBC Balderdash and Piffle site
BBC press release announcing the first series
BBC press release announcing the second series
Oxford English Dictionary's Balderdash and Piffle site
Article in OED Newsletter on Balderdash and Piffle from the Chief Editor
Takeaway Media, the producers of the series, with more on each programme
More information on the Balderdash and Piffle books

2006 non-fiction books
BBC Television shows
English etymology
2006 British television series debuts
2007 British television series endings
Crowdsourcing
Works derived from the Oxford English Dictionary